Niklas Dyrhaug (born 6 July 1987) is a Norwegian, former cross-country skier. He competed in the World Cup for ten years.

He represented Norway at the FIS Nordic World Ski Championships 2015 in Falun winning a gold medal in the 4  × 10 km relay. He also represented Norway at the FIS Nordic World Ski Championships 2017 in Lahti winning a bronze medal in the 15 km classical race.

He announced his retirement from cross-country skiing in October 2021.

Cross-country skiing results
All results are sourced from the International Ski Federation (FIS).

Olympic Games

World Championships
 3 medals – (2 gold, 1 bronze)

World Cup

Season standings

Individual podiums
1 victory – (1 ) 
7 podiums – (4 , 3 )

Team podiums

 2 victories – (2 ) 
 2 podium – (2 )

References

External links
 
 
 

1987 births
Living people
People from Sør-Trøndelag
Norwegian male cross-country skiers
FIS Nordic World Ski Championships medalists in cross-country skiing
Tour de Ski skiers
Cross-country skiers at the 2018 Winter Olympics
Olympic cross-country skiers of Norway
Sportspeople from Trøndelag